Carmen Warschaw (c. 1917 – November 6, 2012) was an American philanthropist, politician, and leading figure within the state Democratic Party in California. She was also a former member of the Democratic National Committee and chairwoman of the Southern California Democratic Party. A champion of Democratic politics, political opponents in both parties were known to call her "The Dragon Lady."

Life and career 
Warschaw was born circa 1917 as the daughter of Jewish immigrants, and she attended the University of Southern California. She joined the University of California, Los Angeles's chapter of Alpha Epsilon Phi. She and her late husband of 63 years, Louis Warschaw, helped to establish the USC Casden Institute for the Study of the Jewish Role in American Life at the University of Southern California. The University of Southern California Chair in Practical Politics is also named for the Warschaws through their endowment. (Both had graduated from USC). Her philanthropic work extended to Cedars-Sinai Medical Center, where the Louis Warschaw Prostate Cancer Center bears her family's name.

Warschaw was a delegate to the 1952 Democratic National Convention.

Warschaw was first woman to chair the California Fair Employment Practices Commission, which was founded in 1959 to combat discrimination in housing and employment.

The Los Angeles Times named her Woman of the Year in 1976.

Warschaw died on November 6, 2012, in Los Angeles at the age of 95. Her husband, prominent businessman Louis Warschaw, whom she had been married to for 63 years, died in 2000.

References

LA Times: Carmen H. Warschaw — (obituary, November 14, 2012).
Jewish Journal.com: "Carmen Warschaw, Democratic activist, philanthropist, 95"— (obituary, November 7, 2012).

California Democrats
Philanthropists from California
Jewish American philanthropists
American people of Lithuanian-Jewish descent
People from Arcadia, California
People from Los Angeles
University of Southern California alumni
1947 births
2012 deaths
20th-century American philanthropists
21st-century American Jews